William (Bill) Campbell (born 1929) was a Progressive Conservative party member of the House of Commons of Canada. He was a process operator and farmer by career.

Campbell was a municipal politician in Sarnia Township (today part of the city of Sarnia), initially as a Councillor from 1970 to 1978, then from 1979 to 1980 as Deputy Reeve.

He was a member of the 31st Canadian Parliament after defeating Liberal candidate Bud Cullen at the Sarnia riding in the 1979 federal election. Campbell's term was short as Cullen won his parliamentary seat back in the 1980 election.

Electoral record

Sarnia

Source: Elections Canada

Source: Elections Canada

External links
 

Living people
Members of the House of Commons of Canada from Ontario
People from Sarnia
Progressive Conservative Party of Canada MPs
1929 births